Barden may refer to:

Places
Barden, Craven, North Yorkshire, England
Barden, Richmondshire, North Yorkshire, England

People with the surname
Amelia Barden, Australian footballer 
Brian Barden, American baseball player
Christopher Barden, American lawyer, professor, and psychologist
Dennis Barden, mathematician
Gary Barden, British musician
Jessica Barden, English actress
Laura Barden, Australian field hockey player
Leonard Barden, English chess journalist